Sandra Ann Horn is a British writer living in Southampton. She is also a poet, storyteller and playwright.

Career
Horn's first book for children was Tattybogle, about a happy scarecrow, published in 1995. This book was turned into a musical by Ruth Kenward. A sequel to the book was published in 2000, called The Tattybogle Tree.

Other books for children include Babushka, Nobody, Him and Me, Dandelion Wish and The Mud Maid.

A lecturer in psychology, Horne co-wrote Loss and Bereavement (with Sheila Payne and Marilyn Relf) and Pain: Theory, Research and Intervention (with Marcus Munafo).

Horn is currently developing a Sitcom called The Sweete Sisters.  A pilot episode recently received a rehearsed reading directed by Hugh Allison.

References

External links
 http://www.sandrahorn.com/
 http://www.starshine.co.uk/

1950 births
English children's writers
English dramatists and playwrights
Living people
English women poets
English women dramatists and playwrights